António Rodrigues Martins (27 July 1913 – deceased) was a Portuguese footballer who played as a goalkeeper.

Career
Born in Lisbon, Martins arrived at Sporting CP in 1934, as a 21-year-old, spending the first two seasons in the reserve squad. With Azevedo as undisputed starter, and four league matches in two seasons, he left the Lions in 1938, to join Benfica.

In his first season, he beat Amaro for the keeper position, debuting on 2 October 1938 in a loss against his former team. Over the course of nine seasons, he added more than 140 appearances, winning three league titles, until he lost his place to Rosa in 1946, after representing the club on 265 matches. He received one cap, in a 3–0 win against Switzerland on 1 January 1942.

Honours

Primeira Liga: 1941–42, 1942–43, 1944–45
Taça de Portugal: 1939–40, 1942–43, 1943–44
Campeonato de Lisboa: 1937–38, 1939–40

References
General
 

Specific

External links 
 
 

1913 births
Footballers from Lisbon
Portuguese footballers
Association football goalkeepers
Primeira Liga players
Sporting CP footballers
S.L. Benfica footballers
Portugal international footballers
Year of death missing